Sanganahala is a village in the Yelburga taluk of Koppal district in the Indian state of Karnataka. There are 307 houses in the village.

See also
Benakal
Kallur, Yelburga
Hampi
Koppal
Karnataka

References

Villages in Koppal district